The Mexican small-eared shrew (Cryptotis mexicana) is a species of mammal in the family Soricidae. It is endemic to Mexico.

References

Cryptotis
Endemic mammals of Mexico
Fauna of the Sierra Madre de Oaxaca
Taxonomy articles created by Polbot
Mammals described in 1877